Count Nikolay Vladimirovich Adlerberg (19 May 1819 – 25 December 1892), was a Russian aristocrat who served as Councilor of State and Chamberlain in the imperial court, as well as governor of Taganrog, Simferopol and Finland.

Early life 
Nikolay Adlerberg was born into the Estonian branch of Adlerberg family that belonged to Baltic German nobility. Born on 19 May 1819 in Saint Petersburg as the son Vladimir Fyodorovich Adlerberg, a close friend of Nicholas I, and his wife, Maria Vasilievna Nelidova (1797-1870).

Biography 
Nikolay Adlerberg graduated from the Page Corps of His Majesty in 1837, and in 1838 was appointed aide-de-camp to the Emperor; he participated in wars led by Russia in Caucasus (1841–1842) and Hungary in 1849. After the Hungarian campaign he was promoted to the rank of colonel and awarded with golden weapons.

Adlerberg resigned in 1852 and was attached to the Russian Ministry of the Interior, receiving the title of chamberlain in the court of His Majesty. On 10 June 1853 Adlerberg was appointed Governor of Taganrog, but he left the Governor's office in the hands of general Yegor Tolstoy in spring 1854 due to a declared state of war in Taganrog and the proximity of Crimean War actions. In 1852-1870 he was President of the Russian Imperial Post Department, who introduced the first Russian post stamps.

In 1855, Nikolay Adlerberg was promoted to the rank of mayor-general and married Amalie Gräfin of Lerchenfeld (1808–1888) (in the first marriage Baroness Amalie von Krüdener).

Count Adlerberg served as governor-general of Simferopol and Taurida Governorate (1854–1856) during an uneasy period of the Crimean War. Later he served at the Imperial Russian Diplomatic Mission in Berlin in 1856–1866. Nikolay Adlerberg was promoted to the rank of lieutenant-general in 1861 and infantry-general in 1870, and during sixteen years served as Governor-General of Finland (1866–1881). Being a theater enthusiast, he established the Russian Theater in Helsingfors in 1868, which was named Alexandre Theater in 1879 after Alexander II of Russia.

On 22 May 1881 the Count was named member of the State Council, but was pensioned off from this post after assassination of his protector, Emperor Alexander II of Russia. Nikolay and Amalie Adlerberg moved to Germany, where they settled at Maximilian Lerchenfeld's estate in Tegernsee near Munich.

Nikolay Adlerberg died on 25 December 1892 in Munich, Bavaria.

Honors
Russian orders and decorations
 Knight of the Order of Saint Anna, 3rd Class with Bow, 1842; 2nd Class, 1849; with Crown, 1851; 1st Class with Swords, 1859
 Golden Sword "For Bravery", 1844
 Knight of the Order of Saint Vladimir, 4th Class, 1848; 3rd Class, 1854; 2nd Class, 1865; 1st Class, 1876
 Knight of the Order of Saint Stanislaus, 1st Class, 1855
 Knight of the Order of the White Eagle, 1867
 Knight of the Order of Saint Alexander Nevsky, 1872; in Diamonds, 1875

Foreign orders and decorations
 :
 Commander of the Imperial Order of Leopold, 1849
 Knight of the Imperial Order of the Iron Crown, 1st Class, 1853
 : Grand Cross of the Merit Order of Saint Michael, 1864
 : Grand Cross of the Royal Guelphic Order, 1863
 : Commander of the Ludwig Order, 2nd Class, 17 June 1840
  Kingdom of Prussia:
 Knight of the Order of the Red Eagle, 1st Class, 18 October 1861; Grand Cross, 4 September 1879
 Knight of the Royal Order of the Crown, 1st Class, 11 June 1864; with Enamel Band of the Red Eagle Order, 1865
 : Grand Cross of the Order of the White Falcon, 9 July 1859

See also
 Amalie Adlerberg

References 

 
 full text of En Orient, impressions et réminiscences by count N. Adlerberg, 1867

|-

1819 births
1892 deaths
Nobility from Saint Petersburg
People from the Russian Empire of Swedish descent
Counts of the Russian Empire
Russian military personnel of the Crimean War
Governors of Taganrog
Governors of the Grand Duchy of Finland
Members of the State Council (Russian Empire)
Expatriates from the Russian Empire in Germany
Governors of the Taurida Governorate
Recipients of the Order of St. Anna, 1st class
Recipients of the Order of St. Vladimir, 1st class
Recipients of the Order of the White Eagle (Russia)
Recipients of the Order of Saint Stanislaus (Russian), 1st class
Recipients of the Gold Sword for Bravery
Military personnel from Saint Petersburg